is a Japanese anime and manga series created by Kenji Morita. The series revolves around household robot Robotan, who is created By Kan-chan and lives with an everyday Japanese family as a domestic servant and friend to the children. Like Doraemon, his good intentions don't always work out, with comic consequences. The original series was produced by Daiko Advertising. Production moved to Tokyo Movie Shinsha for the 20th-anniversary color remake New Robotan (1986) under director Masaharu Okuwaki.

Plot
Robotan is a robot made by a school boy named Kan-chan, a nerd. He has special abilities like "Robotan Copter", "Robotan Punch" etc. His arch Rival is Botchi, a small kid who dislikes Robotan and makes several plans to destroy him or make him a slave, but Robotan destroys all his plans. He has also a little crush on his teacher, Umi. He is very fond of bananas which gives him power. His male mentor Uminoyamais is also in love with Umi, at which Robotan is angered.

Media

Manga
Written and illustrated by Kenji Morita, the manga began serialization in the Shonen Gaho magazine in 1966. The manga was published simultaneously with the 1966 anime version after Morita was hired by Daiko Advertising to create a series similar to Obake no Q-Taro.

Anime

1966 anime
The 1966 anime version of Robotan was produced by Daiko Advertising and the animation was outsourced to four studios, all located in Osaka. The studios providing the animation were Puppe Production, A Production, Sun Production, and Nakamura Production, all of which would take turns producing the episodes. All the stories were handled at Daiko Advertising, which would then be sent the four studios. The film would then be sent back to Daiko for editing and dubbing work.

The series was aired on Fuji Television from October 4, 1966 to September 27, 1968 for 104 episodes. To this day, it's unknown how many episodes still survive. The films were thrown out by Daiko several years ago and ended up as collectors items.

1986 anime
The 1986 anime color remake was produced by Daiko who contracted Tokyo Movie Shinsha to handle the production of it. It aired on Yomiuri Television from January 6 to September 22, 1986 for 33 episodes.

Characters
Robotan voiced by Hyosuke Kanbe (1966), Hiroko Maruyama (1986)
Kan-chan voiced by Yoko Matsui (1966), Eiko Yamada (1986)
Bocchi voiced by  Hiromi Onoe (1966), Chika Sakamoto (1986)
Kiiko voiced by Takako Nakamori (1966), Mayumi Tanaka (1986)

Opening themes
1966 series:
 Robotan no Uta (ロボタンの歌)

1986 series:
 I'm Robotan (ボクはロボタン)

References

External links
 
 

1966 anime television series debuts
1986 anime television series debuts